Boston's sign is the spasmodic lowering of the upper eyelid on downward rotation of the eye, indicating exophthalmic goiter.

Similar to von Graefe's sign, it is observed in people with Graves-Basedow disease, a type of hyperthyroidism. In this disease, the immune system attacks the thyroid gland and the soft tissues surrounding the eyes. As a result, the eyes are often pushed forward in the eye sockets, a condition known as exophthalmos.

See also
Graves orbitopathy

References

Eye diseases
Symptoms and signs: Endocrinology, nutrition, and metabolism